Ione Elveda Wood Gibbs ( 1871 – June 1923) was an American educator, journalist, and clubwoman. She served as vice-president of the National Association of Colored Women from 1912 to 1914.

Early life
Ione Elveda Wood was born in Burlington, New Jersey, the daughter of George Wood and Emma Simmons Wood. She attended high school in Atlantic City. Her uncle William J. Simmons was the president of Kentucky Normal and Theological Institute, so she attended that school and trained as a teacher, earning her degree in 1888.

Career
Wood was an instructor at the Kentucky Normal and Theological Institute while she was still a teenage student there. She wrote freelance articles, and from 1888 to 1891 was on the editorial staff of Our Women and Children, a Baptist women's magazine run by her uncle. "Miss Ione E. Wood ranks today among the foremost of our women", commented one contemporary writer, "first, from the standpoint of acknowledged intellectual ability to write; second, as an earnest educator and race advocate".

After marriage, Gibbs was active in the Ada Sweet Pioneer Club, a literary and musical club in Minneapolis. In 1905, she served as the first president of the Minnesota State Federation of Afro-American Women's Clubs, after black women's groups were refused membership in the existing Minnesota Federation of Women's Clubs. From 1912 to 1914, she was vice-president of the National Association of Colored Women. She wrote an essay, "Woman's Part in the Uplift of the Negro Race" (1907), which was published nationally, and is still occasionally reprinted.

Personal life
Wood married restaurant owner Jasper Gibbs in 1890. They had five sons: Jasper, Hiram, Morris, Mark, and Wendell. They resided in Minneapolis. Wood died in 1923.

References

1870s births
1923 deaths
19th-century American women writers
19th-century American journalists
Journalists from New Jersey
American women journalists
African-American women journalists
African-American journalists
African-American women writers
People from Burlington, New Jersey
People from Minneapolis
Clubwomen
20th-century African-American people
20th-century African-American women